Federico Delbonis and Renzo Olivo were the defending champions but Delbonis decided not to participate.
Olivo played alongside Dane Propoggia.
Philipp Marx and Florin Mergea won the title, defeating Colin Ebelthite and Jaroslav Pospíšil 6–4, 4–6, [10–4] in the final.

Seeds

Draw

Draw

References
 Main Draw

Citta di Como Challenger - Doubles
2012 Doubles